Hiram is an unincorporated community in Kaufman County, located in the U.S. state of Texas. According to the Handbook of Texas, the community had a population of 34 in 2000. It is located within the Dallas/Fort Worth Metroplex.

History
Hiram was once known as Locust Grove. A post office was established at Hiram in 1893 and remained in operation until 1906, with James Hiram Hughes as postmaster. The community had mercantile stores, a cotton gin, three churches, a doctor's office, and a sawmill. The population of Hiram was 110 from 1904 to 30 in the late 1940s to 1990. It then had a Baptist church, a cemetery, and a nursing home all named Locust Grove in 1985. The population went up to 34 in 2000.

Geography
Hiram is located on Farm to Market Road 2965 south of Texas State Highway 20 on the eastern edge of Kaufman County.

Education
Hiram is served by the Wills Point Independent School District.

References

Unincorporated communities in Kaufman County, Texas
Unincorporated communities in Texas